NTW can refer to:

 Nanjangud Town railway station, Karnataka, India (station code: NTW)
 Napoleon: Total War, a 2010 video game
 National Theatre Wales, an English-language theatre company of Wales, United Kingdom
 National Tire Wholesale, an American tire distributor 
 Nationwide Airlines (South Africa) (ICAO code: NTW)
 Negro Theatre Workshop, a former Black British theatre company 
 New Territories West, part of the New Territories, Hong Kong
 Nottoway language, an indigenous language of the United States (ISO 639-3 code: ntw)

See also 

 Denel NTW-20, a South African anti-materiel rifle